Israel "Iz" Piedra  is a New Hampshire state representative and attorney. He represents Manchester in the New Hampshire House of Representatives, having been first elected in 2018. He is a graduate of Milford High School, Bates College, and Boston College Law School.

References

External links 
 

Living people
Democratic Party members of the New Hampshire House of Representatives
American lawyers
Boston College Law School alumni
1990 births